The FT 30 (FT Ordinary Index or FTOI, not "FTSE 30") is a now rarely used index that is similar to the Dow Jones Industrial Average. As an index of stocks to represent the real trends on the market, the FT 30 has been superseded by the FTSE 100, which was introduced in 1984.

Background
The purpose of the FT 30 was to give a selection of stocks, which capture the range and essence of UK companies. The index was devised in 1935 by Maurice Green and Otto Clarke of the Financial News and was termed the "Financial News 30-share index" until that paper merged with the Financial Times in 1945. The companies listed in the index are made up of those in the industrial and commercial sectors. It excludes government stocks, and used to exclude financial sector (banks, insurance, etc.).

The FT 30 index was calculated using the geometric mean.
As Rowley states, this had the effect of understating movements in the index compared to using the arithmetic mean; and there are circumstances where this is undesirable.

List of FT 30 companies

See also
 UK company law
 FTSE 100
 FTSE 250

References

Further reading
 Oxford Dictionary of Finance and Banking, 
 Berger, D. & Jackson, B. ; The Motley Fool UK Investment Workbook,

External links
 FT.com - FT 30 info

British stock market indices
1935 introductions